The women's tournament in the 2018 Rugby World Cup Sevens was held at AT&T Park in San Francisco alongside the men's tournament in which the teams competed for the Women's Rugby Sevens World Cup.

Format
Unlike previous editions, the tournament was played for the first time in a knock-out only format.
 Teams in the Championship Cup competed for the Women's Rugby Sevens World Cup trophy and bronze medals.
 Losing teams in the Championship Cup Quarter-finals competed for 5th Place.
 Losing teams in the Championship Cup Round of 16 (first round) competed for the Challenge Trophy and 13th Place.
 All teams played four matches.

Teams

Squads

Draw
The sixteen teams were seeded as follows:
 The ten core teams of the 2016–17 World Rugby Women's Sevens Series and the 2017–18 World Rugby Women's Sevens Series were seeded according to their accumulated scores from the former series alongside the 2017 Dubai Women's Sevens and 2018 Sydney Women's Sevens.
 Through becoming a 2017–18 core team, Japan was seeded 11th.
 The remaining five were determined through the teams' ranking performance in the 2018 Hong Kong Women's Sevens.

Match officials
World Rugby announced a panel of nine match officials for the women's tournament.

 Alhambra Nievas (Spain)
 Joy Neville (Ireland)
 Sara Cox (England)
 Adam Jones (Wales)
 Ben Crouse (South Africa)

 Sakurako Kawasaki (Japan)
 Hollie Davidson (Scotland)
 Rebecca Mahoney (New Zealand)
 Beatrice Benvenuti (Italy)

Tournament

13th Place

Challenge Trophy

5th Place

Championship Cup

Tournament placings

Player scoring

Source: World Rugby

See also
 2018 Rugby World Cup Sevens – Men's tournament

References

 
2018
Women
International women's rugby union competitions hosted by the United States
rugby union
2018 in women's rugby union